Poon Yuen Chung (潘婉聪; 1 September 1972 - 21 April 1995) was a Hong Kong national executed in Singapore for drug trafficking.

Biography
Born in British Hong Kong in 1974, Poon Yuen Chung was working as a dance hostess at the time of her arrest. In July 1991, Poon informed her parents she was going on a camping trip to Lamma Island, but in reality secretly travelled to Bangkok instead.

Arrest at Changi Airport
On 16 July 1991, Poon and her accomplice Lam Hoi Ka (林凯嘉) arrived at Changi Airport on a flight from Bangkok. Customs officer Mohd Rawi's attention was caught by two large canvas bags on the baggage claim belt of Terminal 2, as there were no folds in the fabric at the bottom and he believed he could see the outline of solid objects inside. Poon and Lam collected the two canvas bags and started walking towards the express lane of the customs counter.

After stopping them and demanding their passports, the customs officer noted their demeanor immediately changed from jovial to nervous. Discovering they had both flown in from Thailand, he asked Poon to open her bag for a search. Suspecting the bag had a false bottom, both women were escorted to the Customs Duty Office where a more through search could be conducted. Both of their bags had false bottoms made of plywood, with plastic packets underneath containing a powdery substance that was later determined to be heroin. Poon had 6 packets containing 4.4 kg of heroin in the false bottom of her suit case, while Lam had 7 packets containing 5 kg of heroin in her bag.

On 18 July 1991, Poon and Lam were charged with the importation of a total of 9.5 kg of heroin, with an estimated value of $9 million, into Singapore.

Trial
On 10 September 1993, Deputy Public Prosecutor (DPP) Ong Hian Sun described to the court how both Poon and Lam the were stopped for a passport check at the customs counter of Terminal 2 at 11:50am on the day in question. Customs officer Mohd Rawi inspected both passports & briefly searched Poon's bag, before taking both women to the Customs Duty Office for further questioning. After their luggage had been dismantled it was determined that Poon had 6 plastic packets containing 3 kg of pure heroin in the false bottom of her bag, while Lam had 7 plastic packets containing 3.45 kg of pure heroin in her bag.

In their defence, the women stated that they had flown to Bangkok for a 3-day holiday, and while there made friends with a Thai couple named Mr and Mrs Go. The couple took them out sight seeing and on shopping trips, where Mr Go bought them new canvas bags as gifts. Mrs Go then transferred the contents of Poon and Lam's original suit cases into the new bags the night before they flew to Singapore. Both Poon and Lam denied knowing the bags contained false bottoms and that they contained hidden drugs.

DPP Ong argued that Poon and Lam had failed to rebut the legal presumption that they were in possession of and had knowledge of the drugs they were carrying. Their demeanor when asked by officials to check their bags was also important, as customs officer Mohd Rawi said both were stunned when told they wanted to examine the two bags. Their reaction showed they knew they had something illegal in their luggage.

Furthermore, neither Poon nor Lam told the customs officers about Mr and Mrs Go or explained how they obtained the bags on the day they were caught and first questioned. The prosecution also found it unbelievable that that they would not have checked their belongings carefully before departing Thailand, especially since two strangers had provided the bags and then packed them on their behalf.

Verdict
On 28 September 1993, Poon was found guilty as charged and sentenced to death for importing 3 kilograms of heroin into Singapore, contrary to Section 7 of the Misuse of Drugs Act. Lam, who was under 18 at the time of her arrest, was also found guilty but was instead sentenced to indefinite detention at the President's Pleasure.

Appeal
On 18 January 1994, the Appeals court dismissed Poon's appeal against her conviction. Her defence lawyer Loo Ngan Chor had argued the original trial judge M.P.H Rubin had erred when he ruled Poon's could not be believed because her original statements to police were different than her testimony in court during her trial. He also asserted that the packets containing the heroin were handled by customs officers without wearing gloves, therefore possibly obliterating any fingerprint evidence Poon could have relied on to back up her testimony about the Thai couple.

Rejecting both arguments, Chief Justice Yong Pung How ruled that Poon would not have mentioned the Thai couple at a much later stage, knowing she was being charged with a capital offence of drug trafficking, if she had in fact not known what was in the bags. Instead of waiting for her fourth interview with police, the court felt that she would have offered up this important information at the first opportunity. Also, Poon had failed to rebut the legal presumptions of the possession and knowledge, as she had been caught red handed with the heroin in her possession.

Execution
Poon Yuen Chung was hanged at Changi Prison on the morning of 21 April 1995. On the same morning, another two Hong Kongers Tong Ching Man and Lam Cheuk Wang, as well as two other drug convicts were also executed at the same prison as Poon.

See also 
 Capital punishment for drug trafficking
 Capital punishment in Singapore

References

External links
 
 

20th-century executions by Singapore
1974 births
1991 crimes in Singapore
1995 deaths
Hong Kong criminals
Hong Kong drug traffickers
Executed Hong Kong people
People executed for drug offences
Hong Kong people
People executed by hanging